The 2004 LPGA Tour was a series of weekly golf tournaments for elite female golfers from around the world which took place from March through December 2004. The tournaments were sanctioned by the United States-based Ladies Professional Golf Association (LPGA). This was the 55th season since the LPGA Tour officially began in 1950. The season consisted of 32 official money events. Total prize money for all tournaments was $42,875,000.

Annika Sörenstam continued to dominate women's golf in 2004, winning eight tournaments and $2,544,707 in prize money. Four other players earned over $1 million. There were six first-time winners in 2004: Moira Dunn, Christina Kim, Lorena Ochoa, Jennifer Rosales, Kim Saiki, and Karen Stupples. Ochoa (Mexico) and Rosales (Philippines) were the first winners of their respective countries to win on the LPGA Tour.

For details of what happened in the main tournaments of the year see 2004 in golf.

Tournament schedule and results
The number in parentheses after winners' names show the player's total number of official money, individual event wins on the LPGA Tour including that event.

Tournaments in bold are majors.

Leaders
Money List leaders

Full 2004 Official Money List

Scoring Average leaders

Full 2004 Scoring Average List - navigate to "2004", then "Scoring Average"

Award winners
The three competitive awards given out by the LPGA each year are:
The Rolex Player of the Year is awarded based on a formula in which points are awarded for top-10 finishes and are doubled at the LPGA's four major championships. The points system is: 30 points for first; 12 points for second; nine points for third; seven points for fourth; six points for fifth; five points for sixth; four points for seventh; three points for eighth; two points for ninth and one point for 10th.
2004 Winner: Annika Sörenstam. Runner-up: Grace Park
The Vare Trophy, named for Glenna Collett-Vare, is given to the player with the lowest scoring average for the season.
2004 Winner: Grace Park. Runner-up: Annika Sörenstam
The Louis Suggs Rolex Rooke of the Year Award is awarded to the first-year player on the LPGA Tour who scores the highest in a points competition in which points are awarded at all full-field domestic events and doubled at the LPGA's four major championships. The points system is: 150 points for first; 80 points for second; 75 points for third; 70 points for fourth; and 65 points for fifth. After fifth place, points are awarded in increments of three, beginning at sixth place with 62 points. Rookies who make the cut in an event and finish below 41st each receive five points.  The award is named after Louise Suggs, one of the founders of the LPGA.
2004 Winner: Shi Hyun Ahn. Runner-up: Aree Song

See also
2004 in golf

External links
LPGA official website

LPGA Tour seasons
LPGA Tour